The Albanian Basketball Cup 2019 is the 63rd edition of the Albanian Basketball Cup, the top annual basketball cup competition played by Albanian teams and organized under the authority of the  Albanian Basketball Association (FSHB).

Tirana was the defending champion, while Teuta won the competition after 52 years, 1965 was the last time Teuta won the Albanian Basketball Cup.

Competition Format 
The Basketball Cup 2019 is played at the middle of the season, when the league is paused for the cup. The mid-season standing is taken into account to pair the matches.

All the Albanian teams from the Superliga and First Division compete for the Cup. Each game is played once in a single knock-out game.

There is a first round of qualification played by the teams from the First Division, from which only two teams qualify to the final bracket phase played against the teams from the First Division.

The qualification and quarter finals rounds are hosted in the court of the higher ranked team, while the Final 4 are played in a neutral court, in two consecutive days (1st and 2 February 2019) in Tirana, at the Feti Borova Sport Hall in the Tirana Olympic Park.

Teams and ranking 

At the middle (10 games played of 20 total) of the season the following teams will play the championship as ranked in the Superliga and First Division:

Mid-season standing of Superliga

Mid-season standing of First Division

Brackets

Final 
The final is played between Teuta and Goga Basket, both from Durrës. Goga Basket was at its first participation in the competition, as the team has participated to the Albanian Albanian Superlica for the first time.

References

External links
Albanian Basketball Federation site

Albanian Basketball League seasons
Albania
Basketball
Basketball